The 1994 European Figure Skating Championships was a senior-level international competition held in Copenhagen, Denmark. Elite skaters from European ISU member nations competed in the disciplines of men's singles, ladies' singles, pair skating, and ice dancing.

Results

Men

Ladies

Pairs

Ice dancing

References

External links
 https://web.archive.org/web/20081026042005/http://www.eskatefans.com/skatabase/euromen1990.html
 http://eiskunstlaufecke.com/archiv/1993-94/eem94.shtml

European Figure Skating Championships, 1994
European Figure Skating Championships, 1994
European Figure Skating Championships
Figure skating in Denmark
January 1994 sports events in Europe
1990s in Copenhagen
International sports competitions in Copenhagen